Sia Saran, also rendered as Seyah Saran or Siah Sara, may refer to:
 Sia Saran-e Olya
 Sia Saran-e Sofla